Oberea macilenta is a species of beetle in the family Cerambycidae. It was described by Newman in 1842.

References

Beetles described in 1842
macilenta